Extatosoma is a genus of phasmids, in the monotypic subfamily Extatosomatinae, with two species. One occurs in Australia, one in New Guinea. Both have a colour morph imitating leaves, and one imitating lichen.

Name
The genus name is derived from Ancient Greek έκστασις "to be outside oneself" and soma "body".

Species
The Phasmida Species File lists:
 Extatosoma popa Stål, 1875  (New Guinea)
 Extatosoma tiaratum (Macleay, 1826) - type species (Australia)

References

External links
 Phasmid Study Group: Extatosoma
 Pictures and descriptions of subspecies (in French)

Phasmatodea genera
Insects of Australia
Phasmatidae
Taxa named by George Robert Gray